TOMCAT/SLIMCAT is an off-line chemical transport model (CTM), which models the time-dependent distribution of chemical species in the troposphere and stratosphere.  It can be used to study topics such as ozone depletion and tropospheric pollution, and was one of the models used the IPCC report on Aviation and the Global Atmosphere .  It incorporates a choice of detailed chemistry schemes for the troposphere or stratosphere, and an optional chemical data assimilation scheme.

The original model code, called the Toulouse Off-line Model of Chemistry And Transport (TOMCAT), was written by Martyn Chipperfield at Météo France.  "Off-line" in this sense describes the fact that although the meteorological data (wind components and other fields) which are used as input to the CTM typically derive from a general circulation model (GCM), the CTM is run as a separate program outside of a GCM; this is as distinct from a chemistry simulation scheme which runs within a GCM, in which the simulated chemical distributions, e.g. of ozone, can provide feedback on the meteorology via the GCM's radiation scheme.

A version called the Single Layer Isentropic Model of Chemistry And Transport (SLIMCAT) was developed in 1995.  This used a level of constant potential temperature (or equivalently, of constant specific entropy, hence isentropic), exploiting the fact that due to approximate conservation of energy, atmospheric motions are approximately adiabatic and hence air parcels remain on isentropic levels on short timescales.  A diabatic heating scheme was later added, to allow for multiple isentropic levels with transport between them on longer timescales, although the name "SLIMCAT" has remained despite the multiple levels.

The two programs are now maintained as a single code base, which runs in Fortran, and has been parallelised.

TOMCAT has been further extended to include a detailed treatment of aerosol. GLOMAP (Global Model of Aerosol Processes) simulates a wide range of aerosol species including black carbon, sulfate, sea spray, soil dust, and secondary organic aerosol. The primary purpose of TOMCAT/GLOMAP is to simulate aerosol radiative forcing and the impact of aerosol on climate.

References 

 Chipperfield, M.P., New Version of the TOMCAT/SLIMCAT Off-Line Chemical Transport Model: Intercomparison of Stratospheric Tracer Experiments, Q. J. R. Meteorol. Soc., 132, 1179–1203, 2006.
 Spracklen, D.V., Pringle, K.J., Carslaw, K.S., Chipperfield, M.P. and Mann, G.W.,  A global off-line model of size-resolved aerosol microphysics: I. Model development and prediction of aerosol properties,  Atmospheric Chemistry and Physics, Vol. 5, 2227–2252, 2005.

External links 
 TOMCAT/SLIMCAT Project homepage at University of Leeds, UK (with further published references)
 GLOMAP Project page

Numerical climate and weather models